Frederick Charles Ward (1900–1990) was a furniture and interior designer in Australia.  Ward worked with native wood in his long career.  His designs were installed in the creation of the Australian National University campus, in his capacity as first head of the design unit.  Ward was commissioned to design furniture for prominent public buildings, including the National Library, and the Australian pavilion at Expo '67, Montreal, Quebec.  He acted as a design consultant to the Reserve Bank in Sydney.  He was consulted by the Australian Department of Aircraft Production in production of timber-framed aircraft during WWII; this type of construction was used for the Beaufighter and the Mosquito Bomber.  The Beaufighter was assembled in Sydney and Melbourne during the war from components sourced across the country.

References 

1900 births
1990 deaths
Australian interior designers
Furniture designers
People from Black Rock, Victoria
Artists from Melbourne
National Gallery of Victoria Art School alumni
Australian people of English descent
Academic staff of the Australian National University
Australian Members of the Order of the British Empire